Quarantined is a 1970 American TV movie starring Gary Collins, John Dehner, Gordon Pinsent, Susan Howard and Dan Ferrone. It was aired on February 24, 1970 as an ABC Movie of the Week.

Plot
A group of doctors operating a medical clinic suddenly find themselves in a crisis that threatens to turn into an epidemic.

Cast
 Gary Collins as Dr. Larry Freeman
 John Dehner as Dr. John Bedford
 Gordon Pinsent as Dr. Bud Bedford
 Susan Howard as Dr. Margaret Bedford
 Dan Ferrone as Dr. Tom Bedford
 Sharon Farrell as Ginny Pepper
 Wally Cox as Wilbur Mott
 Sam Jaffe as Mr. Berryman
 Terry Moore as Martha Atkinson
 Vince Howard as James Barning
 Virginia Gregg as Nurse Nelson

References

External links

1970 television films
1970 films
ABC Movie of the Week
Films about viral outbreaks
Films directed by Leo Penn
1970s English-language films